Myron W. Fohr (17 June 1912 in Milwaukee, Wisconsin – 14 January 1994 in Milwaukee, Wisconsin) was an American racecar driver. He competed in the Indianapolis 500 two times.

Race career
Fohr made 25 AAA American Championship Car Racing starts from 1947 to 1950. He won four times, twice in 1948 (at Milwaukee and Springfield) and twice in 1949 (at Milwaukee and Trenton in back-to-back rounds of the championship). He finished second in the national championship in both 1948 and 1949. Other than a good finish in the Indy 500, Fohr had a dismal 1950 season, failing to qualify several times. His last Champ Car appearances came in 1951 when he failed to qualify for both the Indy 500 and the following race at the Milwaukee Mile.

Fohr also won a number of AAA-sanctioned stock car feature races at his hometown track, the Milwaukee Mile.

Complete AAA Championship Car results

Indy 500 results

World Championship career summary
The Indianapolis 500 was part of the FIA World Championship from 1950 through 1960. Drivers competing at Indy during those years were credited with World Championship points and participation. Myron Fohr participated in 1 World Championship race, finishing eleventh.

References

External links
Myron Fohr statistics at ChampCarStats.com

1912 births
1994 deaths
Indianapolis 500 drivers
Sportspeople from Milwaukee
Racing drivers from Wisconsin
AAA Championship Car drivers